I Wanna Hear Your Song is a 2019 South Korean television series starring Yeon Woo-jin, Kim Se-jeong, Song Jae-rim and Park Ji-yeon. It aired on KBS2 from August 5 to September 24, 2019.

The series ranked among the Top 10 highest ranking dramas in South Korea during its whole run.

Synopsis 
Hong Yi-young witnessed a murder but she cannot remember anything about what happened. With the help of Jang Yoon, she tries to recover her memories from that day.

Cast

Main 
 Yeon Woo-jin as "Jang Yoon"/Jang Do-hoon
A pianist in an orchestra who is Tone Deaf. He helps Yi-young with her insomnia.
 Kim Se-jeong as Hong Yi-young
A timpanist who suffers from insomnia. She can only fall asleep if she listens to a tone-deaf person sing.
 Song Jae-rim as Nam Joo-wan
An orchestra conductor who has a lot of charisma.
 Park Ji-yeon as Ha Eun-joo
A violinist in the orchestra who is known for her arrogance.

Supporting

People around Jang Yoon 
 Jung Sung-mo as Jang Seok-hyeon
Jang Yoon's father. He has a very cold personality.

People around Hong Yi-young 
 Yoon Bok-in as Park Yeong-hee
Ji-seop's wife
 Park Chan-hwan as Hong Ji-seop
Yi-young's uncle 
Lee Si-won as Hong Soo-yeong
Yi-young's cousin

Others 
 Lee Byung-joon as Song Jae-hwan
 Jo Mi-ryung as Seo Soo-hyang
 Kim Sang-gyun as Moon Jae-hyeong
 Yi-young's ex-boyfriend
 Yoon Joo-hee as Yoon Mi-rae
 Hong Seung-hee as Yang Soo-jang	
 Yang Soo-jung as Yang Soo-jung (secretary)
 Yoo Gun as Michael Lee
 Lee Jung-min as Choi Seo-joo
 Jo Yoo-jung as Yoo Je-ni

Special appearances
 Jung Soo-young as Gong Su-mi (Ep. 1,7,9)
Pianist who was fired by Joo-wan.
 Im Ji-kyu as Yi-young's blind date (Ep. 10)
 Kim Si-hoo as Kim Ian/real Jang Yoon
Jang Do-hoon's brother who died mysteriously 1 year ago.

Original soundtrack

Part 1

Part 2

Part 3

Part 4

Ratings
In this table,  represent the lowest ratings and  represent the highest ratings.

International broadcast

Streaming platforms

Awards

Notes

References

External links 
  
 
 
 

Korean Broadcasting System television dramas
Korean-language television shows
2019 South Korean television series debuts
2019 South Korean television series endings
South Korean romantic comedy television series
South Korean mystery television series
South Korean musical television series